Revu Lakku Naik Belamgi is an Indian politician and member of the Congress.

Political career
Belamgi was a member of the Karnataka Legislative Assembly from the Gulbarga Rural constituency in Kalaburagi district from 2008 to 2013.

References 

People from Kalaburagi
Bharatiya Janata Party politicians from Karnataka
Karnataka MLAs 2008–2013
Living people
Janata Dal (Secular) politicians
1942 births